Ceratodontidae is an extinct family of lungfish with fossils known from the earliest Triassic to the Eocene.

Taxonomy 
Although the extant Queensland lungfish was formerly also classified in this family due to its similar appearance, phylogenetic evidence indicates that it belongs in a different family, Neoceratodontidae. Despite the family's name, Neoceratodontidae actually diverged from other lungfish earlier than Ceratodontidae did, although both are estimated to have diverged during the Late Carboniferous along with the rest of Ceratodontoidei.

Due to diverging later, Ceratodontidae is also closer to the crown group of the suborder Ceratodontoidei (which contains the extinct Gnathorhizidae and the extant Lepidosirenidae) than Neoceratodontidae is. Ceratodontidae serves as a sister group to a clade containing Ptychoceratodontidae, Lepidosirenidae, and Gnathorhizidae, whereas Neoceratodontidae is a sister group to the clade of Ceratodontidae and the other three families.

Genera 
The following genera are known from the family:

 †Ariguna
 †Ceratodus 
 †Epiceratodus
 †Lupaceratodus Galula Formation, Tanzania, Cretaceous
 †Metaceratodus
 †Microceratodus (?)
 †Potamoceratodus
 †Tellerodus
 †Retodus
Paraceratodus was also classified in this family but phylogenetic evidence supports it being the most basal member of Ceratodontoidei.

References 

Lungfish
Taxa named by Theodore Gill
Prehistoric lobe-finned fish families